Gernikako Arbola ("the Tree of Gernika" in Basque) is an oak tree that symbolizes traditional freedoms for the Biscayan people, and by extension for the Basque people as a whole. The Lords of Biscay (including kings of Castile and Carlist pretenders to the throne) swore to respect the Biscayan liberties under it, and the modern Lehendakari of the Basque Country swears his charge there.

Dynasty
In the Middle Ages, representatives of the villages of Biscay would hold assemblies under local big trees. As time passed, the role of separate assemblies was superseded by the Guernica Assembly in 1512, and its oak would acquire a symbolic meaning, with actual assemblies being held in a purpose-built hermitage-house (the current building dates from 1833). It was the Spanish regent Maria Christina accompanied by her infant daughter Queen Isabella II the last Spanish monarch to swear an oath to the charters under the iconic oak in 1839.

The known specimens form a dynasty:
 "the father", planted in the 14th century, lasted 450 years
 the "old tree" (1742–1892), re-planted in 1811. The trunk now is held in a templet in the surrounding garden.
 the third (1858–2004), re-planted in 1860, survived the Bombing of Guernica in 1937 but had to be replaced because of a fungus. The gardeners of the Biscayan government keep several spare trees grown from the tree's acorns.
 the fourth (1986–2015) was replanted on the site of its father on 25 February 2005. It died of a humidity related disease on 15 January 2015. 
 the fifth  was planted in March 2015, aged 14.

The Tree of Gernika came to prominence during the First and  Third Carlist Wars as a symbol of Basque liberties, whose renown and appreciation spread among the Basque diaspora world over during the late 19th century and mid-20th century thanks to the popularity of Jose Maria Iparragirre's namesake anthem. Maria Cristina of Savoy, regent during her daughter Isabel's minority in the First Carlist War, swore the Basque charters under the Oak in 1839.

The tree's significance is illustrated by an event which occurred shortly after the Guernica bombings. When the Francoist troops took the town, the Tercio of Begoña, formed by Carlist volunteers from Biscay, put an armed guard around the tree to protect it against the Falangists, who had wanted to fell this symbol of Basque nationalism. On 26 June 1950, Xavier of Bourbon-Parma, claimant to the Spanish throne during Franco's dictatorial regime, swore the Basque charters in the Oak of Guernica.

An oak tree is depicted on the heraldic arms of Biscay and subsequently on the arms of many of the towns of Biscay. An oak leaf logo is used by the local government of Biscay. The logo of the Basque nationalist party Eusko Alkartasuna has one half red and the other green, the colors of the Basque flag. An old version of the logo of the Basque nationalist youth organisation Jarrai also display oak leaves. The Basque authorities present descendants of the tree as a symbol of friendship to Basque diaspora groups and related cities.

Other fuero trees in Biscay
Malato in Luiando, another tree of special significance for the Basques.
The Abellaneda oak for the Encartaciones Juntas.
The Gerediaga oak for the Durango area.
The Aretxabalagana oak, where Biscaynes had to receive their lord when he came to put his oath on the fuero under the Gernika oak.

See also
, the meeting place of the Frisians and symbol of the Frisian freedom.
List of individual trees

References

External links

Arbol de Gernika in the Spanish-language Auñamendi Encyclopedia.
 Tourism in the Basque Country
Page on the tree  at the site of the General Assemblies of Biscay (English, Basque, Spanish and French).
 L'arbre de Guernica , a 1975 Surrealist film by Fernando Arrabal.

Individual oak trees
Basque history
Guernica
Individual trees in Spain
Trees in culture